The 1976–77 Montreal Canadiens season was the Canadiens' 68th season. The team is regarded to be the greatest NHL team ever composed. The Canadiens won their 20th Stanley Cup in 1976–77, taking the NHL championship. They set an NHL record for most points in a season by a team with 132 points. They outscored their opponents by 216 goals (also a league record), a differential average of 2.7 goals per game.

Of the 24 players on the roster, 14 were drafted by the Canadiens: Pierre Bouchard, Rick Chartraw, Brian Engblom, Bob Gainey, Rejean Houle, Guy Lafleur, Michel Larocque, Pierre Mondou, Bill Nyrop, Doug Risebrough, Larry Robinson, Steve Shutt, Mario Tremblay, and Murray Wilson. The only player on the roster not developed by the Canadiens was Peter Mahovlich.

They tied or won 72 games, three more than the Detroit Red Wings in 1995–96. They won 60 games this season, which was eventually surpassed by both the 1995–96 Detroit team and the 2018–19 Tampa Bay Lightning.  It's important to note that both these teams' 61st and 62nd victories came after their 80th game.

Regular season

Final standings

Schedule and results

Playoffs

Stanley Cup Final

Jacques Lemaire scored three game-winning goals, including the Cup winner in overtime. Guy Lafleur won the Conn Smythe Trophy for scoring 9 goals and 17 assists during the playoffs.

Boston Bruins vs. Montreal Canadiens

Montreal wins the series 4–0.

Guy Lafleur won the Conn Smythe Trophy as playoff MVP.

Player statistics

Regular season
Scoring

Goaltending

Playoffs
Scoring

Goaltending

Awards and records
 Prince of Wales Trophy
 Ken Dryden and Michel Larocque, Vezina Trophy
 Ken Dryden, Goaltender, NHL First Team All-Star
 Guy Lafleur, Art Ross Trophy
 Guy Lafleur, Conn Smythe Trophy
 Guy Lafleur, Hart Memorial Trophy
 Guy Lafleur, Lou Marsh Trophy
 Guy Lafleur, right wing, NHL First Team All-Star
 Guy Lafleur, NHL leader, assists (80)
 Guy Lafleur, NHL leader, points (136)
 Guy Lapointe, defence, NHL Second Team All-Star
 Larry Robinson, defence, NHL First Team All-Star
 Steve Shutt, left wing, NHL First Team All-Star
 Steve Shutt, NHL leader, goals (60)
 132 points, NHL record for most points in a season by a team
 +216 goal differential, NHL record for highest team differential

Draft picks

References
 Canadiens on Hockey Database
 Canadiens on NHL Reference
 Canadiens on Hockey Reference

Stanley Cup championship seasons
Norris Division champion seasons
Montreal Canadiens seasons
Montreal Canadiens season, 1976-77
Eastern Conference (NHL) championship seasons
Mon
National Hockey League All-Star Game hosts